The 1933 Wightman Cup was the 11th edition of the annual women's team tennis competition between the United States and Great Britain. It was held at the West Side Tennis Club in Forest Hills, Queens in New York City in the United States.

See also
 1933 Davis Cup

References

1933
1933 in tennis
1933 in American tennis
1933 in British sport
1933 in women's tennis